Fereimi Cama (2 March 1955 – 2 July 2021) was an Anglican bishop. He was the first Fijian to be Bishop of Polynesia in the diocese's history. 

Cama was born on 2 March 1955 in the Fijian village of Nukuni, Ono-i-Lau. He was raised a Methodist but became an Anglican in 1987. He became a lay reader and then studied for ordination. He eventually rose to be Dean of Holy Trinity Cathedral, Suva. Cama died in the Colonial War Memorial Hospital, Suva, on 2 July 2021.

References

1955 births
2021 deaths
Anglican bishops of Polynesia
21st-century Anglican bishops in Oceania
Fijian Anglican bishops
Anglican deans in Oceania
People from Lau Province
Converts to Anglicanism from Methodism
21st-century Anglican archbishops in New Zealand
Bishops in the Cook Islands